Siegfried Paul Otto Borries (10 March 1912 – 12 August 1980) was a German violinist and violin educator.

Life 
At the first International Competition for Voice and Violin in Vienna in 1932, he was the only German among 300 applicants to receive the "Großen Internationalen Preis" and a few months later, in October 1932, also the "Mendelssohn Prize Berlin" from the State Academy of Music in Berlin. At the age of 20, on 1 January 1933, he was appointed 1st concertmaster of the Berlin Philharmonic by Wilhelm Furtwängler. In May 1936, he was awarded the first ever "Musikpreis der Reichshauptstadt Berlin". Also in 1936, he became a teacher at the Stern Conservatory. At the Reich Music Days in the summer of 1939, Borries was awarded the National Music Prize 1939 as the best German violinist of the next generation of soloists. From 1941 to 1945, Borries was special concert master of the Staatskapelle Berlin under Herbert von Karajan's authority.

As a chamber musician, he played from 1933 to 1945 together with his Philharmonic colleagues Heinrich Breiden, flute and Hans Ahlgrimm, 2nd violin in the Borries-Breiden-Ahlgrimm Trio. Borries was listed as an important violinist of the NS State on Goebbels' Gottbegnadeten list.

After the end of the war, in 1945, he took over the master classes for violin at the newly founded "International Music Institute Berlin". He also resumed his position as concertmaster of the Philharmonic Orchestra and became director of its chamber music association. From 1948, he taught violin (since 1949 as professor) at the Berlin University of the Arts and developed in the following years a lively concert activity as soloist and chamber musician in Germany and abroad.

In 1957, due to differences with the Berlin Senate on questions of fees, Borries refused to participate in the orchestra's 75th anniversary concert. He was then placed on leave until his final departure from the orchestra on 31 August 1961.

Borried died in Berlin at the age of 68.

Prizes 
 1932: Internationaler Musikpreis Wien
 1932: Mendelssohn Scholarship für ausübende Tonkünstler
 1936: Musikpreis der Stadt Berlin
 1939: Nationaler Musikpreis für den besten deutschen Geiger des Solistennachwuchses

Recordings 
 with the Berliner Philharmoniker on Electrola, the two violin concertos by Ludwig van Beethoven conducted by Johannes Schüler (1939) as well as Mendelssohn's Violin Concerto, Sergiu Celibidache conducting (1948)
 Max Bruch's Concerto No. 1 with the Staatskapelle conducted by Fritz Zaun (1943)
 Radio recording of the Reichs-Rundfunk-Gesellschaft Johannes Brahms' Violin Concerto (1936, Berliner Funk-Orchester conducted by Max Fiedler)
 with Michael Raucheisen as accompanist, the "Spring" Sonata, Op. 24, by Ludwig van Beethoven
 Violin Sonata (Duo), D.574, by Franz Schubert
 Sonatina by Antonín Dvořák, and his Three Romantic Pieces, recordings from the years 1943 and 1944.
 The violin concerto by Ferruccio Busoni (1949, Berlin Philharmonic under Celibidache) has been preserved as a recording by RIAS.
 On the US-Label Urania – with the Sinfonie-Orchester of Radio Berlin directed by Artur Rother – again the violin concerto by Ferruccio Busoni and Richard Strauss's Violin Concerto.

Further reading 
 Berliner Philharmoniker: Variationen mit Orchester – 125 Jahre Berliner Philharmoniker. Vol. 2, Biografien und Konzerte. Verlag Henschel, 2007, 
 Kürschners Deutscher Musiker-Kalender 1954. de Gruyter, Berlin 1954
 Hanspeter Bennwitz: Interpretenlexikon der Instrumentalmusik. Francke, Bern 1964
 Gerassimos Averinos: Künstler-Biographien.
 Munzinger-Archiv Personen
 Variationen mit Orchester. Henschel, Berlin 2007,

References

External links 
 
 

German classical violinists
Male classical violinists
Academic staff of the Berlin University of the Arts
Concertmasters
1912 births
1980 deaths
People from Münster
20th-century German male musicians